Ventura Ruiz Aguilera (1820–1881) was a Spanish lyric poet, called "the Spanish Béranger.”

Biography
He was born in 1820 at Salamanca, where he graduated in medicine.  He moved to Madrid in 1844, where he engaged in political journalism and later occupied important official positions under the liberal ministries.  Aguilera became director of the National Archaeological Museum at Madrid, where he died on 1 July 1881.

Writing
Aguilera won considerable popularity with a collection of poems entitled Ecos Nacionales (1849). In this work, and in the journals he edited or controlled, he endeavored to arouse the masses to a sense of their national dignity.  His Elegías y armonías (1863) was no less successful than the Ecos, but his Sátiras (1874) and Estaciones del año (1879) showed that his powers were declining. Several collections of his prose writings, which consisted mostly of short novels, have been published. Selections from his poems were published under the respective titles Inspiraciones (1865) and Poesías (1880).

He wrote under the obvious influence of Lamartine, preaching the gospel of liberalism and Christianity in verses which, though deficient in force, leave the impression of a sincere devotion and a charming personality.

Works 
 El grito de la conciencia
 Del agua mansa nos libre Dios, 1847
 Bernardo de Saldaña, 1848
 Un conspirador de a folio, 1848
 Camino de Portugal, 1849
 La limosna y el perdón, 1853
 El beso de Judas, 1860
 Obras poéticas. Elegías, 1862
 Proverbios ejemplares, 1864
 Armonías y cantares, 1865
 El mundo al revés, 1865, 2 v.
 Inspiraciones: poesías selectas, 1865 
 La arcadia moderna, 1867
 Cuentos del día, 1868 
 "Balada de Cataluña", 1868
 El libro de la patria, 1869
 La leyenda de Noche-Buena, 1872
 Las estaciones del año, 1879

Notes

References

External links
 
 

1820 births
1881 deaths
Spanish poets
Writers from Madrid
19th-century poets
People from Salamanca
University of Salamanca alumni